This list of compositions by Max Bruch is sorted by genre.

Operas 
 Claudine von Villa Bella, Op. posthumous
 Die Loreley, Op. 16 (1861)
 Hermione, Op. 40 (1872)
 Scherz, List und Rache, Op. 1

Orchestral works 
 Suite No. 1 on Russian Themes, Op. 79b (Berlin, 1903)
 Suite No. 2 for Orchestra (Nordland Suite) (on Swedish themes), Op. posth. (Berlin, 1906)
 Suite No. 3 for Orchestra and organ, Op. posth. (Berlin, 1904–1915)
 Swedish Dances (Berlin, 1892)
 Symphony No. 1 in E flat major, Op. 28 (Sondershausen, 1868)
 Symphony No. 2 in F minor, Op. 36 (Berlin, 1870)
 Symphony No. 3 in E major, Op. 51 (Berlin, 1887)
 Serenade After Swedish Melodies, Op. Posth. (String Orchestra) (1916) (reworking of the Nordland Suite)

Works for Soloist(s) and Orchestra 
 Adagio appassionato for violin and orchestra in C♯ minor, Op. 57 (Berlin, 1891)
 Adagio on Celtic Themes for cello and orchestra, Op. 56 (Berlin, 1891)
 Ave Maria for cello and orchestra, Op. 61 (Berlin, 1892)
 Canzone for cello and orchestra, Op. 55 (Berlin, 1891)
 Concerto for clarinet, viola, and orchestra in E minor, Op. 88 (1911)
 Concerto for two pianos and orchestra in A flat minor, Op. 88a
 Kol Nidrei, for cello and orchestra, Op. 47 (Berlin, 1881)
 In Memoriam, Adagio for violin and orchestra, Op. 65 (Berlin, 1893)
 Romance for viola and orchestra in F major, Op. 85 (Mainz, 1911)
 Romance for violin and orchestra in A minor, Op. 42 (Berlin, 1874)
 Scottish Fantasy, for violin and orchestra in E flat major, Op. 46 (Berlin, 1880)
 Violin Concerto No. 1 in G minor, Op. 26 (1866-7. Premiered (revised version) Bremen, 1868)
 Violin Concerto No. 2 in D minor, Op. 44 (Berlin, 1878)
 Violin Concerto No. 3 in D minor, Op. 58 (Berlin, 1891)
 Konzertstück (Concert Piece) for violin and orchestra in F minor, Op. 84 (Berlin, 1903)
 Serenade in A minor for violin and orchestra, Op. 75 (composed Cologne, 1899 August)

Choral works 

 Die Birken und die Erlen (G. Pfarrius), Op. 8 (Leipzig, 1859)
 Frithjof: Szenen aus der Frithjof-Sage (E. Tegnèr), Op. 23 (Breslau, 1864)
 Schön Ellen (Geibel), ballad, Op. 24 (Bremen, 1867)
 Salamis: Siegesgesang der Griechen (H. Lingg), Op. 25 (Breslau, ?1868)
 Frithjof auf seines Vaters Grabhügel (Tegnèr), Op. 27 (Leipzig, 1870)
 Normannenzug (J.V. von Scheffel), Op. 32 (Leipzig, 1870)
 Dithyrambe (after Schiller), Op. 39 (Berlin, ?1871)
 Odysseus: Szenen aus der Odyssee (Wilhelm Paul Graff- after Homer?), Op. 41 (Berlin, 1872)
 Arminius (J. Cüppers), oratorio, Op. 43 (Berlin, 1877)
 Das Lied von der Glocke, oratorio for solo voices, chorus (SATB), and orchestra, after Das Lied von der Glocke of Friedrich Schiller, Op. 45 (1872)
 Achilleus (H. Bulthaupt), Op. 50 (Berlin, 1885)
 Das Feuerkreuz (H. Bulthaupt, after Walter Scott: The Lady of the Lake), Op.52 (Berlin, 1889)
 Leonidas (H. Bulthaupt), Op. 66 (Berlin, 1894)
 Moses (text by Ludwig Spitta (1845–1901)), Op. 67 (Berlin, 1894–95)
 In der Nacht: Nun schläfet man (Gerhard Tersteegen), Op. 72 (Magdeburg, 1897)
 Gustav Adolf (text by Albert Hackenberg (de)), oratorio, Op. 73 (Berlin, 1898)
 Damajanti (after anon. Indian poem), Op. 78 (Berlin, 1903)
 Die Macht des Gesangs (after Schiller), Op. 87 (Berlin, 1912)
 Trauerfeier für Mignon (after Goethe), Op. 93 (Leipzig, 1919)

Chamber works 
 Four pieces for cello and piano, Op. 70 (Berlin, 1896)
 Eight pieces for clarinet, viola, and piano, Op. 83 (1910)
 Octet for Strings in B-flat major, Op. posth. (Berlin, 1920)
 Piano Trio in C minor, Op. 5
 Piano Quintet in G minor, Op. posth. (Liverpool, 1886)
 Fantasie for Two pianos, Op. 11
 , Op. posth. (1849)
 String Quartet (1850)
 String Quartet in C minor, Op. posth. (1852)
 String Quartet No. 1 in C minor, Op. 9 (1858–59)
 String Quartet No. 2 in E major, Op. 10 (1860)
 String Quintet in A minor, Op. posth. (Berlin, 1918)
 String Quintet in E-flat major, Op. posth. (Berlin, 1918)

Lieder 
 Five Songs, Op. 97
 Five Songs for Baritone, Op. 59
 Four Songs, Op. 15
 Four Songs, Op. 18
 Four Songs, Op. 33
 Für die Eltern WoO
 Hymnus, Op. 13
 Lieder für gemischten Chor, Op. 86
 Lieder und Gesänge, Op. 49
 Nine Songs, Op. 60
 Seven Part-Songs, Op. 71
 Seven Songs, Op. 6
 Siechentrost, Op. 54
 Siechentrost Lieder (Solace in Affliction), Op. 54
 Six Songs, Op. 7 Szene der Marfa (Martha's Scene from Schiller's Demetrius), Op. 80
 Ten Songs, Op. 17
 Three duets, Op. 4
 Zwölf schottische Volkslieder, Op. posth.

References

External links
 Home page

Bruch